Wang Weipu (born 26 November 1993) is a Chinese footballer currently playing as a midfielder for Shaanxi Chang'an Athletic.

Career statistics

Club
.

References

1993 births
Living people
Chinese footballers
Association football midfielders
China League Two players
China League One players
Liaoning F.C. players
Liaoning Shenyang Urban F.C. players
Shaanxi Chang'an Athletic F.C. players